Depati Parbo Airport  is located in Kerinci Regency, Jambi Province (part of Sumatra), Indonesia.

Airlines and destinations

The following destinations are served from the airport:

Statistics

References

Airports in Sumatra
Buildings and structures in Jambi